Ihor Petrovych Palytsia is a Ukrainian businessman and politician. From May 2014 until May 2015 he worked as Governor of Odesa Oblast. In November 2015 Palytsia was elected chairman of the Volyn Oblast regional parliament. In the July 2019 Ukrainian parliamentary election Palytsia won a seat as an independent candidate. In parliament he joined the For the Future faction.

Biography
Palytsia was born 10 December 1972 in Lutsk. In 1994, he graduated from the Lesya Ukrainka Volyn National University in his place of birth. Since 1993 he has been a businessman and he was a board member of (the national oil and gas company of Ukraine) Naftogaz from 2003 till 2007. Palytsia unsuccessfully took part in the 2006 Ukrainian parliamentary election for the Peasant Party of Ukraine. The party won 0,31% of the votes.

In the 2007 Ukrainian parliamentary election Palytsia was elected MP (as #68 on the party list) of Our Ukraine–People's Self-Defense Bloc. In the 2012 Ukrainian parliamentary election he was elected with 40.27% of the votes in simple-majority constituency #22 (situated in Lutsk) as a non-party affiliate. He did not enter any faction in the Verkhovna Rada (parliament).

Palytsia was appointed by Ukrainian President Petro Poroshenko Governor of Odesa Oblast on 6 May 2014, 4 days after the 2 May 2014 Odesa clashes that killed more than 40 people.

In the 2014 Ukrainian parliamentary election Palytsia was again re-elected into parliament; this time after placing 34th on the electoral list of Petro Poroshenko Bloc. He stayed on as Governor till 30 May 2015 when President Poroshenko appointed Mikheil Saakashvili Governor of Odesa Oblast.

In July 2015 Palytsia became a member of the political council of the party UKROP. On 26 November 2015 he was elected chairman of the Volyn Oblast regional parliament.

In the July 2019 Ukrainian parliamentary election Palytsia won a seat as an independent candidate. In parliament he joined the For the Future faction. May 2020 Palytsia was elected chairman of the For the Future party. According to Palytsia For the Future is de facto a continuation of UKROP.

Political image
In the spring of 2014, the Ukrainian press mentioned Palytsia as being close to Ukrainian oligarch (and then fellow Governor of Dnipropetrovsk Oblast) Ihor Kolomoyskyi. In August 2021 Ukrainska Pravda reported that Palytsia and Kolomoyskyi no longer shared business assets.

References 

1972 births
Living people
People from Lutsk
Independent politicians in Ukraine
Sixth convocation members of the Verkhovna Rada
Seventh convocation members of the Verkhovna Rada
Ninth convocation members of the Verkhovna Rada
Governors of Odesa Oblast
Ukrainian businesspeople in the oil industry
Ukrainian billionaires
Petro Poroshenko Bloc politicians
FC Volyn Lutsk
Ukrainian football chairmen and investors
Ukrnafta people